Sympistis seth is a brown medium-sized moth of the family Noctuidae. The species was first described by James T. Troubridge in 2008. It is found in Oregon. They have an asymmetrically oval orbicular spot, a black-banded cream hindwing, and white fringes on both wings.

The wingspan is about 30 mm.

References

seth
Moths described in 2008